Events in the year 1616 in Japan.

Incumbents
Monarch: Go-Mizunoo

Deaths
June 1 - Tokugawa Ieyasu (b. 1543), shōgun

References

 
1610s in Japan
Japan
Years of the 17th century in Japan